Sergey Ivlev can refer to:

 Sergey Ivlev (badminton), Russian badminton player
 Sergey Ivlev (water polo) (born 1969), Russian water polo player